Kıdaai Maqsin (Kudai Bakhsi) or Kudaai Bakhsilaan is a fire-demon in Yakut mythology.  He was the first blacksmith and the originator of ironworking.  He lives in an iron house surrounded by flames. 

K'daai is said to possess curative powers.  In Yukut epics he heals the broken bones of heroes and tempers the souls of shamans.

Chyky, another famous Yakut smith, is not the same as K'daai.  Chyky not only makes excellent weapons, but gives wise advice as well.

References
 Popov, A. (1933) "Consecration ritual for a blacksmith novice among the Yakuts" Journal of American Folklore 46(July-Sept.): pp. 257–271, p. 260-261;
 Stutley, Margaret (2002) Shamanism: A Concise Introduction Routledge,  p. 26;
 Eliade, Mircea (1979) The Forge and the Crucible: The Origins and Structure of Alchemy University of Chicago Press, Chicago  p. 81-82;

Yakut mythology
Turkic deities